Astronauts of Antiquity (New York, New York, USA)  are an alternative, electropop band based out of Los Angeles, California with roots in New York City. The trio, known for their luminous electronic soundscapes, tantalizing dance rhythms, pop-conscious melodies, and provocative lyrical themes, has released three records since their inception. Astronauts of Antiquity's most recent single Paradise comes off of their third release, the Beyond The Maze EP.

Life and career

Formation

The group began in 2001 in Chapel Hill, NC with India, Bradd and bassist Charles Zuber - who all met in NYC before a move to Chapel Hill.  The band went through a few incarnations with a trip hop pop and dub themed sound adding influences from the Asian underground.

Career

The group had a deal with NYC DJ label Liquid Sound Lounge.  Legendary producer Rick Rubin offered them a record deal when he was president of American Recordings. In 2005, AOA released their debut album AOA1, followed by their sophomoric album Rocket Science for Dummies in 2009.
Coming back to NYC, AOA met Ivica and began recording with a new bolder vision.  Ivica moved to LA and the rest of the group set up shop in their Venice Beach studio with the addition of the LA spoken word and rap artist Deploi who contributed to 4 songs off their upcoming EP.
In May 2016, Astronauts of Antiquity released their first single Paradise (ft. Deploi) off of upcoming EP Beyond The Maze. The song was inspired by the March Against Monsanto and anti-GMO movement, which the group has voiced their support towards. Beyond the Maze is expected to be released in the summer of 2016.

Influences
The group's influences range from Billie Holiday to Jimi Hendrix, Radiohead to Daft Punk, Eminem, Macklemore and Rihanna, and  Little Dragon to Erykah Badu.

Discography

Albums
Beyond The Maze (2016)
Rocket Science for Dummies (2009)
AOA 1 (2005)

Singles
"Future Back" (2016)
"Paradise" (2016)

References

External links
Astronauts of Antiquity Official Website

Anti-GMO activists
Musical groups from Chapel Hill-Carrboro, North Carolina
Alternative rock groups from North Carolina